Chita is a city and the administrative center of Zabaykalsky Krai, Russia, located on the Trans-Siberian Railway route, roughly  east of Irkutsk.

Geography
Chita lies at the confluence of the Chita and Ingoda Rivers, between the Yablonoi Mountains to the west and the Chersky Range to the east.

History

Pyotr Beketov's Cossacks founded Chita in 1653.
The name of the settlement apparently came from the local River  Chita.

Following the Decembrist revolt of 1825, from 1827 several of the Decembrists suffered exile to Chita.
According to George Kennan, who visited the area in the 1880s, "Among the exiles in Chita were some of the brightest, most cultivated, most sympathetic men and women that we had met in Eastern Siberia."

When Richard Maack visited the city in 1855, he saw a wooden town, with one church, also wooden. He estimated Chita's population at under 1,000, but predicted that the city would soon experience fast growth, due to the upcoming  annexation of the Amur valley by Russia.

By 1885, Chita's population had reached 5,728, and by 1897 it increased to 11,500. In 1897 the Trans-Siberian Railway reached Chita; rail traffic from 1899 rapidly made Chita the transport hub and industrial centre of the Transbaikal.

During the Russian revolution of 1905, revolutionary socialists declared the Chita Republic.  Tsarist government forces took control again in January 1906.

The Bolsheviks took power in Chita in February 1918. The Imperial Japanese Army occupied Chita from September 1918 to 1920 in the course of the Siberian intervention. On behalf of the White movement, Ataman Grigory Semyonov's Eastern Okraina ruled from Chita for some few months in early 1920 with Japanese support. From October 1920 to November 1922 the city served as the capital of the Far Eastern Republic, which became part of the  RSFSR in November 1922.

In 1945, the Soviet authorities held Puyi, who had reigned (1908–1912, 1917) as the last Emperor of China, and some of his associates as prisoners in the city, in a former sanatorium for officers.

Administrative and municipal status
Chita is the administrative center of Zabaykalsky Krai, and, within the framework of administrative divisions, it also serves as the administrative center of Chitinsky District, to which it is also subordinated. As a municipal division, the city of Chita together with one rural locality in Chitinsky District is incorporated as Chita Urban Okrug.

City districts
The city is subdivided into four administrative districts: Chernovsky (named after the Chernovskiye coal mines and colloquially known as "Chernovskiye"), Ingodinsky (named after the Ingoda River), Tsentralny, and Zheleznodorozhny.

Chernovsky Administrative District used to be a mining settlement, which was incorporated into Chita in 1941. Chernovskiye mines themselves are a geological nature monument of international status.

Transportation
Chita is served by Kadala Airport, situated 15 km to the west.

Education

Chita is home to several facilities of higher education:
Transbaikal State University (formerly Chita State University)
Chita State Academy of Medicine

Military
Chita Northwest air base is located nearby, as well as the 101st (Hub) Communications Brigade and the 53rd Material Support Regiment.

Sports
FC Chita is Chita's association football club. 

An indoor arena for speed skating is planned.

Climate
Chita experiences a dry-winter  borderline humid continental climate/subarctic climate (Köppen climate classification: Dwb/Dwc) with very hot, very dry winters and warm, relatively wet summers.

Twin towns – sister cities

Chita is twinned with:
 Hailar District, China (1992)
 Choibalsan, Mongolia (1994)
 Manzhouli, China (1999)
 Hulunbuir, China (2001)
 Ulan-Ude, Russia (2011)

Notable people
Yevgeni Alkhimov (born 1977), Russian professional footballer
Nataliya Kuznetsova (born 1991), Russian professional female bodybuilder who holds the world armlifting, bench press, and deadlift titles
Oleg Lundstrem (1916–2005), Soviet and Russian jazz composer
Igor Mirnov (born 1984), Russian professional ice hockey player
Ivan Nagibin (born 1986), Russian professional football player
Lev Okhotin (1911–1948), member of the Supreme Council of the Russian Fascist Party
Aleksandr Perfilyev (1895–1973), Russian journalist, poet and writer
Anastasia Pivovarova (born 1990), Russian professional tennis player
Boris Polevoy (1918–2002), Russian historian
Aleksandra Samusenko (1922–1945), Soviet Tank Captain, Sole female tankman in 1st Guards Tank Army
Volodymyr Shkidchenko (born 1948), Ukrainian military, General of Army of Ukraine
Sergei Smirnov (born 1950), Russian security services official
Anatoly Sobchak (1937–2000), Russian politician
Vitaly Solomin (1941–2002), Soviet and Russian actor, director and screenwriter
Yury Solomin (born 1935), Soviet and Russian actor and director
Alina Stadnik (born 1991), Ukrainian female wrestler
Alexander Stranichkin (born 1955), Abkhazian politician
Lyudmila Titova (born 1946), Russian speed skater
Dmytro Tymchuk (born 1972), Ukrainian military expert and blogger
Yemelyan Yaroslavsky (1878–1943), Russian revolutionary, Soviet politician, communist party organizer
Oksana Zhnikrup (1931-1993), Ukrainian ceramicist, whose works inspired Jeff Koons
Stanislav Drobyshevsky (born 1978), Russian anthropologist and science popularizer

References

Notes

Sources

External links
Official website of Chita  
Chita Business Directory 
Account of Englishman's life in Chita, 2005-2006
Old Chita, website of local history 

 
Transbaikal Oblast
1653 establishments in Russia
Russian Far East